Saad Al-Zahrani (born 1 July 1980) is a Saudi Arabian football midfielder who played for Saudi Arabia in the 2004 AFC Asian Cup.

Honours

International
Saudi Arabia
Islamic Solidarity Games: 2005

References 

Living people
Saudi Arabian footballers
Saudi Arabia international footballers
Association football midfielders
Okaz Club players
Al Nassr FC players
Al-Faisaly FC players
Al-Wehda Club (Mecca) players
Al-Hazem F.C. players
Al-Najma SC players
Al-Jabalain FC players
2004 AFC Asian Cup players
1980 births
Saudi First Division League players
Saudi Professional League players
Saudi Second Division players